Else Ehser (1894–1968) was a German stage actress. She also made numerous appearances in German films in supporting roles, such as her performance as Maria Theresa of Spain in the 1935 film The Private Life of Louis XIV.

Selected filmography

 M (1931) - Woman (uncredited)
 Mädchen in Uniform (1931) - Gardrobiere Elise (uncredited)
 The First Right of the Child (1932)
 Elisabeth and the Fool (1934) - Haushälterin Hörnlein
 Hanneles Himmelfahrt (1934) - Tulpe
 The Private Life of Louis XIV (1935) - Maria Theresa, Königin von Frankreich
 Pillars of Society (1935)
 The Dreamer (1936) - Frl. Wetterhahn - Schneiderin
 Family Parade (1936) - Gräfin Güldenstjerna
 City of Anatol (1936) - Rosas Mutter
 Daphne and the Diplomat (1937) - Schneiderin
 The Yellow Flag (1937) - Gloria Sanders
 Tango Notturno (1937) - Die Garderobiere bei Mado
 You and I (1938) - Nettie
 Silvesternacht am Alexanderplatz (1939)
 Menschen vom Varieté (1939) - Emilie Schmitz - Garderobiere
 Madame Butterfly (1939)
 Central Rio (1939) - Garderobiere
 Die gute Sieben (1940) - Die 2. Garderobiere
 Das leichte Mädchen (1940) - Tante Christa
 Aufruhr im Damenstift (1941) - Frl. von Bruun
 The Golden City (1942) - Dienstmagd bei Anna
 When the Young Wine Blossoms (1943) - Sophie
 Der Mann, dem man den Namen stahl (1944) - Die ältere Kundin von Elviras Schalter
 Der Puppenspieler (1945)
 Das Leben geht weiter (1945)
 No Place for Love (1947)
 The Adventures of Fridolin (1948) - Die Pensionsdame
 The Court Concert (1948)
 Girls Behind Bars (1949) - Hanna Späthe, 'Hannchen'
 Don't Play with Love (1949) - Souffleuse
 A Day Will Come (1950) - Lisette
 Immortal Beloved (1951) - Trienke
 Herz der Welt (1952)
 Postlagernd Turteltaube (1952)
 Little Red Riding Hood (1953) - Großmutter
 Roman eines Frauenarztes (1954) - Schwester Emma
 Der Froschkönig (1954) - Kleiderfrau Marliese
 Roman einer Siebzehnjährigen (1955)
 Devil in Silk (1956) - Frau Schwarz
 Studentin Helene Willfüer (1956)
 Like Once Lili Marleen (1956) - Aufwartefrau
 Goodbye, Franziska (1957) - Kathrin
 The Glass Tower (1957) - Frau Wiedecke
 Bezaubernde Arabella (1959)
 Ich schwöre und gelobe (1960) - Frau Säbisch
 The Castle (1968) - Mizzi (final film role)

References

Bibliography 
 Klossner, Michael. The Europe of 1500-1815 on Film and Television: A Worldwide Filmography of Over 2550 Works, 1895 Through 2000. McFarland & Company, 2002.

External links 
 

1894 births
1968 deaths
Actors from Leipzig
German stage actresses
German film actresses